This is a list of Members of Parliament (MPs) elected to the House of Commons of the United Kingdom by English constituencies for the Fifty-Fifth Parliament of the United Kingdom (2010 to present).

It includes both MPs elected at the 2010 general election, held on 6 May 2010, and those subsequently elected in by-elections.

The list is sorted by the name of the MP, and MPs who did not serve throughout the Parliament are italicised. New MPs elected since the general election are noted at the bottom of the page.

Full composition before 2015 election

MPs in the East of England region

MPs in the East Midlands region

MPs in the London region

MPs in the North East region

MPs in the North West region

MPs in the South East region

MPs in the South West region

MPs in the West Midlands region

MPs in the Yorkshire and the Humber region

By-elections
2011 Oldham East and Saddleworth by-election
2011 Barnsley Central by-election
2011 Leicester South by-election
2011 Feltham and Heston by-election
2012 Bradford West by-election
2012 Manchester Central by-election
2012 Corby by-election
2012 Rotherham by-election
2012 Middlesbrough by-election
2012 Croydon North by-election
2013 Eastleigh by-election
2013 South Shields by-election
2014 Wythenshawe and Sale East by-election
2014 Newark by-election
2014 Clacton by-election
2014 Rochester and Strood by-election

See also
 2010 United Kingdom general election
 List of MPs elected in the 2010 United Kingdom general election
 List of MPs for constituencies in Northern Ireland 2010–15
 List of MPs for constituencies in Scotland 2010–15
 List of MPs for constituencies in Wales 2010–15
 :Category:UK MPs 2010–2015

Notes

References

England
2010
MPs